Nicolás Martín Córdoba (born November 20, 1989) is an Argentine male artistic gymnast, representing his nation in numerous international competitions. Cordoba qualified for the 2016 Summer Olympics, where he attained an eighteenth-place score of 14.800 on the horizontal bar in the qualifying phase of the tournament, failing to advance to the final.

References

External links 
 

1989 births
Living people
Argentine male artistic gymnasts
Sportspeople from Santa Fe, Argentina
Gymnasts at the 2011 Pan American Games
Gymnasts at the 2015 Pan American Games
Gymnasts at the 2019 Pan American Games
Gymnasts at the 2016 Summer Olympics
South American Games silver medalists for Argentina
South American Games bronze medalists for Argentina
South American Games medalists in gymnastics
Competitors at the 2010 South American Games
Competitors at the 2014 South American Games
Competitors at the 2018 South American Games
Olympic gymnasts of Argentina
Pan American Games competitors for Argentina